Châu Thành is a rural district (huyện) of Kiên Giang province in the Mekong Delta region of Vietnam.

Divisions
The district is divided into the following communes:

Minh Lương, Mong Thọ A, Mong Thọ B, Thanh Lộc, Giục Tượng, Vĩnh Hoà Hiệp, Bình An, Minh Hoà and Phía Tây 

As of 2003 the district had a population of 139,211. The district covers an area of 284 km². The district capital lies at Minh Lương.

References

Districts of Kiên Giang province